Hipparchia hansii is a species of butterfly in the family Nymphalidae. It is endemic to the North African region, mainly Morocco, Algeria, Tunisia and western Libya. Its natural habitats are dense soil, grazed and rocky slopes, and ridges. It prefers to stay in the shade. This is one of the last butterflies that flies in the season.

Subspecies
There are four subspecies of Hipparchia hansii:
H. h. colombati (Tea Ito, Middle Atlas Central)
H. h. tansleyi (Ait Abdallah, Anti-Atlas south-west & Tizi-n-Test, southern High Atlas)
H. h. subsaharae (Jebel Sarrho, Anti-Atlas oriental)
H. h. tlemcen (Monts de Beni-Snassen, Tell Atlas)

Flight period
September to October, depending on altitude and locality.

Food plants
Larvae have been reared on Festuca species.

Sources
Satyrinae of the Western Palearctic - Hipparchia hansii
Species info
"Hipparchia Fabricius, 1807" at Markku Savela's Lepidoptera and Some Other Life Forms

Hipparchia (butterfly)
Butterflies described in 1879